Geotectonics is a peer-reviewed scientific journal published by Springer. The scope of the journal is the tectonics, magmatism, metamorphism, structural geology, mineral resources, geodynamics and the deep structure of the Earth.

The journal is indexed in Science Citation Index Expanded (SciSearch), Journal Citation Reports/Science Edition, SCOPUS, INSPEC, Astrophysics Data System (ADS), Google Scholar, EBSCO, CSA, Academic OneFile, ASFA, Current Contents/Physical, Chemical and Earth Sciences, Gale, Geobase, GeoRef, INIS Atomindex, OCLC, Petroleum Abstracts, ReadCube, SCImago and Summon by ProQuest

See also 
Journal of Petrology
Journal of Structural Geology
Tectonophysics

External links 
 

Geology journals
English-language journals